William Berkeley Lewis (1784 – November 12, 1866) was an influential friend and advisor to Andrew Jackson. He was born in Loudoun County, Virginia, and later moved near Nashville, Tennessee, in 1809.  Major Lewis served as quartermaster under General Jackson. Later, in politics, he was a manager of Jackson and retained considerable influence until Jackson's second term as President of the United States. Jackson appointed Lewis as second auditor of the Treasury, a position he was able to retain until the Polk administration.

Political advisor
In 1822, Lewis and John Eaton attempted to nominate a candidate before the Tennessee legislature to oppose John Williams, who was openly against Jackson's candidacy for president in 1824. After being unable to find a viable candidate, they nominated Jackson himself. The strategy was successful, and Jackson won. The results took him by surprise, and although he did not wish to serve, he accepted the results of the election.

Lewis played a crucial role in electioneering for Jackson during his campaigns for the presidency in 1824 and 1828. Jackson lost in 1824 but won in 1828. Afterwards, his first inaugural address was composed at Lewis's home in Nashville, Tennessee by Jackson, Lewis, and Henry Lee IV. During Jackson's presidency, Lewis resided with him in the White House and served as his advisor. According to Jackson biographer James Parton, "He almost alone retained to the last the friendship of General Jackson, without agreeing with him in opinion upon subjects of controversy." Lewis was seen as part of a group of unofficial advisors known as the "Kitchen Cabinet" who helped Jackson formulate policy.

During the Bank War, Lewis, in contrast to Jackson, took a position moderately in favor of the Second Bank of the United States. Even so, in the fall of 1831, he warned its president, Nicholas Biddle, not to apply for recharter. He correctly predicted that Jackson would see the bill as a challenge to his leadership and veto it. At the 1830 Jefferson Day Dinner at Jefferson Brown's Indian Queen Hotel, Jackson was to give a toast. This took place in the midst of the Nullification Crisis, and John C. Calhoun, Jackson's estranged vice president who supported nullification, would be in attendance. Jackson concluded, according to Lewis, "that the celebration was to be a nullification affair altogether." The following day, Jackson presented three possible toasts to Lewis. "I ran my eye over them and then handed him the one I liked best...He said he preferred that one himself for the reason that it was shorter and more expressive. He then put it into his pocket and threw the others into the fire." Jackson attended the dinner, and to the horror of many in attendance read out the toast: "Our Federal Union. It must be preserved." Calhoun then responded, in part, "The Union, next to our Liberty the dearest."

Other activities
Lewis married Margaret Lewis, daughter of William T. Lewis of Tennessee. John Eaton had first married Margaret's sister Myra. Margaret died after a year of marriage. Lewis later married Adelaide Stokes Chambers, daughter of Montfort Stokes of North Carolina.

Lewis assisted James Parton in the publication of his three-volume biography of Jackson by sending him information, letters, and other documents. He died at his home in Nashville.

References

Bibliography
 
 Harlan, Louis Rudolph. Public Career of William Berkeley Lewis, 1947
 Heiskell, Samuel Gordon. Andrew Jackson and Early Tennessee History
 
 
 Ratner, Lorman. Andrew Jackson and His Tennessee Lieutenants: A Study in Political Culture, 1997

External links
TN Encyclopedia: WILLIAM B. LEWIS

1784 births
1866 deaths
United States presidential advisors
People from Loudoun County, Virginia